The 1992–93 Missouri Tigers men's basketball team represented the University of Missouri as a member of the Big Eight Conference during the 1992–93 NCAA men's basketball season. Led by head coach Norm Stewart, the Tigers finished third in the Big Eight Conference, then unexpectedly won the Big Eight tournament to receive an automatic bid to the NCAA tournament as the No. 10 seed in the West region. Missouri fell to No. 7 seed Temple in the opening round. The Tigers finished with an overall record of 19–14 (5–9 Big Eight).

Roster

Schedule and results

 
|-
!colspan=9 style=| Regular season

|-
!colspan=9 style=| Big Eight Conference tournament

|-
!colspan=9 style=| NCAA tournament

Rankings

References

Missouri
Missouri Tigers men's basketball seasons
Missouri